The 131st Ohio Infantry Regiment, sometimes 131st Regiment, Ohio Volunteer Infantry (or 131st OVI) was an infantry regiment in the Union Army during the American Civil War.

History
The 131st OVI was mustered into the service at Camp Chase in Columbus on May 14, 1864, as an Ohio National Guard unit. It was a part of the Hundred Days Regiments commissioned by Ohio Governor John Brough as rear guard troops in an effort to free up veteran regiments for front-line combat duty in an all-out effort to seize Richmond, Virginia, and hasten the end of the war. Its commander was Col. John G. Lowe. 

On May 15, the new regiment traveled by train to Baltimore, Maryland, where it was assigned to the Second Separate Brigade of the VIII Corps. The 131st never saw any combat. Instead, it primarily served on garrison duty at Fort McHenry, then at Fort Marshall and Federal Hill. Detachments served at Washington, D.C., Harpers Ferry, West Virginia, Fortress Monroe, and City Point, Virginia. On August 19 the regiment was ordered to return to Ohio because the soldiers were nearing the end of their short term of enlistment. The 865 remaining men mustered out at Camp Chase on August 25, 1864. The 131st Regiment lost two enlisted men by disease during its service, though others would succumb to complications of malaria in the years following.

See also

Ohio in the Civil War

References
 Dyer, Frederick Henry, A Compendium of the War of the Rebellion. 3 volumes. New York: T. Yoseloff, 1908. 
 Reid, Whitelaw, Ohio in the War: Her Statesmen, Her Generals, and Soldiers. Volume 2. Cincinnati: Moore, Wilstach, & Baldwin, 1868.

Further reading
 Ohio Roster Commission. Official Roster of the Soldiers of the State of Ohio in the War on the Rebellion, 1861–1865, compiles under the direction of the Roster commission. 12 vol. Akron: Werner Co., 1886–95.

External links
 Ohio in the Civil War: 131st OVI by Larry Stevens

Units and formations of the Union Army from Ohio
1864 establishments in Ohio
Military units and formations established in 1864
Military units and formations disestablished in 1864
1864 disestablishments in Ohio